Ulvi Bakhshaliyev is an Azerbaijani diplomat currently serving as Azerbaijan Ambassador Extraordinary and Plenipotentiary to the Republic of Belarus. He presented his letter of credence to the Minister of Foreign Affairs of the Republic of Belarus on 1 September 2021.

References 

Azerbaijani diplomats
Living people
Date of birth missing (living people)
Place of birth missing (living people)
Year of birth missing (living people)